郡 may refer to:

Commandery (China)
Districts of Japan
Counties of North Korea
Counties of South Korea
Urban districts of Vietnam